The twelfth government of Israel was formed by Levi Eshkol on 22 December 1964, towards the end of the fifth Knesset.

Eshkol kept the same coalition partners as previously, i.e. Mapai, the National Religious Party, Ahdut HaAvoda, Poalei Agudat Yisrael, Cooperation and Brotherhood and Progress and Development. The only change to the cabinet was Akiva Govrin becoming the country's first Minister of Tourism, having been a Minister without Portfolio in the previous government.

Yosef Almogi and Shimon Peres resigned from the cabinet in May 1965 due to their opposition of the alliance between Mapai and Ahdut HaAvoda. Both joined Ben-Gurion's new party, Rafi in July.

The government served until 12 January 1966, when the thirteenth government took power following the November 1965 elections.

Cabinet members

1 Although Gvati was not an MK at the time, he later entered the Knesset as a member of the Labour Alignment, an alliance of Mapai and Ahdut HaAvoda.

2 Although Yosef was not an MK at the time, he was a member of Mapai.

3 Although Sasson was not an MK at the time, he was elected to the next Knesset as a member of the Labour Alignment, an alliance of Mapai and Ahdut HaAvoda.

4 Died in office.

References

External links
The twelfth government of Israel Knesset website

 12
1964 establishments in Israel
1966 disestablishments in Israel
Cabinets established in 1964
Cabinets disestablished in 1966
1964 in Israeli politics
1965 in Israeli politics
1966 in Israeli politics
 12